The fourth USS Hornet was a schooner that served in the U.S. Navy from 1814 to 1820.

Hornet was purchased at Georgetown, District of Columbia, in 1813, and commissioned 15 March 1814, Sailing Master Joseph Middleton in command.

Hornet served primarily as a dispatch ship along the eastern seaboard of the United States, assisting in some coast and harbor survey work before being sold at Norfolk, Virginia, in 1820.

References
 

Schooners of the United States Navy
War of 1812 ships of the United States
Age of Sail naval ships of the United States
1813 ships